Rearguard Mountain is a  summit located within Mount Robson Provincial Park in British Columbia, Canada. It is part of the Rainbow Range which is a sub-range of the Canadian Rockies. Its nearest higher peak is Mount Robson,  to the southwest. Rearguard is situated between Berg Lake and the Robson Glacier.

History 

It was named in 1922 by the Interprovincial Boundary Survey to describe the point of view of those approaching Mount Robson since the mountain is located at the rear of Robson.

The mountain's name was officially adopted February 1, 1923, by the Geographical Names Board of Canada. It was labelled on Arthur O. Wheeler's 1911 topographic map of Mount Robson.

The first ascent was made in 1913 by an Alpine Club of Canada party.

Climate

Based on the Köppen climate classification, Rearguard Mountain is located in a subarctic climate zone with cold, snowy winters, and mild summers. Winter temperatures can drop below −20 °C with wind chill factors below −30 °C. The months June through September offer the most favorable weather to visit. Precipitation runoff from the mountain drains into the Robson River.

Geology

The mountain is composed of sedimentary rock laid down during the Precambrian to Jurassic periods and pushed east and over the top of younger rock during the Laramide orogeny.

See also

 List of mountains in the Canadian Rockies
 Geography of British Columbia

Gallery

References

External links

Mount Robson Provincial Park website—BC Parks
 Rearguard Mountain weather: Mountain Forecast

Canadian Rockies
Two-thousanders of British Columbia
Cariboo Land District